Eupator (Tiberios Iulios Eupator Philocaesar Philoromaios Eusebes, flourished 2nd century, died c. 170) was a Roman client king of the Bosporan Kingdom. Like many of the late Bosporan kings, Eupator is known mainly from coinage. His coins are known from the period 154–170. His relations to other kings of the Bosporus are unknown; he might have been a son of Cotys II and a brother of his predecessor Rhoemetalces. He was succeeded by Sauromates II, perhaps his nephew, whose coins are first known from the year 172.

Eupator is mentioned in the writings of Lucian (Alexander 57). Lucian had witnessed envoys sent by Eupator to travel to Bithynia to pay the Bosporan Kingdom's yearly tribute to Rome.

See also
 Bosporan Kingdom
 Roman Crimea

References

Monarchs of the Bosporan Kingdom
Roman client rulers
2nd-century births
2nd-century monarchs in Europe
Eupator, Tiberius
170 deaths